65 may refer to: 
 65 (number)
 65 (film), a 2023 American science fiction thriller film
 One of the years 65 BC, AD 65, 1965, 2065
 A type of dish in Indian cuisine, such as Chicken 65, Gobi 65, or Paneer 65